Thailand women's junior national softball team is the junior national team for Thailand.  The team competed at the 2003 ISF Junior Women's World Championship in Nanjing, China where they finished fourteenth.

References

External links 
 International Softball Federation

Softball
Women's national under-18 softball teams
Softball in Thailand
Youth sport in Thailand